Bob Nanna/Elizabeth Elmore EP is a split EP by Bob Nanna of Braid and The City on Film and Elizabeth Elmore of The Reputation and Sarge.  Released on Nanna's Troubleman Unlimited label in 2001, it features a single song from each performer.  This release in particular was Elmore's only output in between her work with Sarge and The Reputation.

Track listing
 Forgiveness - Robert Nanna
 You Blink - Elizabeth Elmore

2001 EPs